Otter Creek Township is a township in Lucas County, Iowa, USA.

History
Otter Creek Township was established in 1853.

References

Townships in Lucas County, Iowa
Townships in Iowa
1853 establishments in Iowa
Populated places established in 1853